Frank Ellwood (born April 18, 1935) is a former American football player, coach, and college athletic administrator. He served as the head football coach at Marshall University from 1975 to 1978 and at Georgia Southern University in 1996, compiling a record of 14–41 in five seasons. He was previously an assistant coach at the Ohio State University and at Ohio University. He won a national championship as a player at Ohio State in 1954. Ellwood served as a senior associate athletic director at Georgia Southern from 1990 until his retirement in 1998. He was the school's interim athletic director from July 25 to December 31, 1995.

Head coaching record

References

1935 births
Living people
American football ends
American football quarterbacks
Air Force Falcons football coaches
Georgia Southern Eagles athletic directors
Georgia Southern Eagles football coaches
High school football coaches in Ohio
Marshall Thundering Herd football coaches
Ohio Bobcats football coaches
Ohio State Buckeyes football coaches
Ohio State Buckeyes football players
People from Dover, Ohio
Players of American football from Ohio